Astrid Grethe Grouleff Heltberg (27 May 1911 – 1996) was a Danish writer.

From 1930 to 1940, she worked as a stenographer at the Rigsdagen.

In 1942, she published a collection of poetry Portræt af en pige. Besides writing essays, memoirs, novels, short stories and children's books, she also published articles in newspapers, magazines and journals. She won a number of awards over the years as well as receiving funding from the Statens Kunstfond. She was also awarded the Tagea Brandts Rejselegat (Travel Scholarship) in 1973.

In 1934, she married Niels Heltberg. Her daughter Bettina became a writer and actor.

Selected works 
 Testamente, poetry (1945)
 Kinesisk lak, poetry (1948)
 Pige fra provinsen (1969)
 En jomfru fra Jylland (1969)
 Vi (1971)
 En gnist af glæde, memoir (1975)
 Alle mine søstre, poetry (1976)

References 

1911 births
1996 deaths
Danish women poets
Danish women novelists
Danish women short story writers
People from Horsens